Jewish on Campus is a student-led Jewish nonprofit organization dedicated towards addressing discrimination against Jewish college students.

History 
In 2020, Jewish on Campus was co-created by Jewish college students, Isaac de Castro and Julia Jassey, as an Instagram page meant to bring awareness to individual incidents of antisemitism on college campuses. However, after online popularity, it transformed into a nonprofit organization. As an organization, Jewish on Campus expanded its work to include a platform for student journalism, data collection and analysis to better understand the state of antisemitism on campuses, and an ambassador program to unify Jewish students across the United States and Canada to make statements representative of American Jewish and Canadian Jewish  students.

In November 2021, Jewish on Campus became a partner organization of the World Jewish Congress.

See also 

 Universities and antisemitism
 AMCHA Initiative

References

External links 

 

Jewish organizations
Anti-racist organizations
Anti-racist organizations in the United States
Opposition to antisemitism
Civil liberties advocacy groups in the United States
Jewish organizations established in the 21st century
2020 establishments in the United States
Student organizations established in the 21st century
Student organizations in the United States